Eric Gustafson (27 May 1897 – 9 April 1981) was a Swedish actor. He appeared in more than 70 films between 1920 and 1979.

Selected filmography

 Karin Daughter of Ingmar (1920)
 Her Little Majesty (1925)
 His English Wife (1927)
 Sin (1928)
 Say It with Music (1929)
 Ulla, My Ulla (1930)
 Dante's Mysteries (1931)
 Ship Ahoy! (1931)
 Colourful Pages (1931)
 International Match (1932)
 A Wedding Night at Stjarnehov (1934)
 Under False Flag (1935)
 Our Boy (1936)
 It Pays to Advertise (1936)
 Russian Flu (1937)
 Julia jubilerar (1938)
 Frestelse (1940)
 Lärarinna på vift (1941)
 Dunungen (1941)
 The Train Leaves at Nine (1941)
 A Girl for Me (1943)
 The Emperor of Portugallia (1944)
 The Österman Brothers' Virago (1945)
 Incorrigible (1946)
 Olof – forsfararen (1947)
 Private Karlsson on Leave (1947)
 Song of Stockholm (1947)
 Carnival Evening (1948)
Living on 'Hope' (1951)
 A Ghost on Holiday (1951)
 Kalle Karlsson of Jularbo (1952)
 Dance in the Smoke (1954)
 Darling of Mine (1955)
 The Halo Is Slipping (1957)

References

External links

1897 births
1981 deaths
Swedish male film actors
People from Växjö